Draganovo is a village in Gorna Oryahovitsa Municipality in Veliko Tarnovo Province in Central Bulgaria.

Draganovo is known in the area for its farms and vegetable gardens. Due to the fertile soil around the village it is one of the main producers of cabbage and tomatoes in the central/north eastern regions of Bulgaria.

After World War II gardeners from Draganovo has been dispatched in Hungary and other parts of Europe to help rebuild the land and make it fertile again.

The river Yantra flows through the village. The river contributes for the village's fertile soils.

Notables
  - Bulgarian writer
 Ivan Bochev - award winning Bulgarian artist

References

Villages in Veliko Tarnovo Province